The 2011 PDC Under-21 World Championship was the first edition of the PDC World Youth Championship, a tournament organised by the Professional Darts Corporation for darts players aged between 14 and 21.

The knockout stages from the last 64 to the semi-finals were played in Barnsley on 16 November 2010, and were not broadcast live on TV. The final took place on 3 January 2011, before the final of the 2011 PDC World Darts Championship, which was shown live on Sky Sports. The two finalists became PDC Pro Tour card holders for 2011 and 2012 and received sponsorship from Rileys Dart Zones. They also received invitations to the 2010 Grand Slam of Darts.

Arron Monk defeated Michael van Gerwen 6–4 in the final to win the inaugural PDC World Youth Championship.

Prize money

Qualification
Qualification was achieved at 50 Rileys Dart Zone tournaments throughout the UK and also various national tournaments throughout the world. The leading eight eligible PDPA members in the PDC Order of Merit on 20 September were seeded into the last 64.

The participants are:

Seeds
  Michael van Gerwen
  Joe Cullen
  Arron Monk
  Michael Smith
  Tom Martin
  Ryan Harrington
  Tony Clark
  Sean White

International qualifiers
  Bryce Book
  Mitchell Clegg
  David Coyne
  Rico Dera
  Dirk van Duijvenbode
  Teemu Harju
  Martin Heneghan
  Benito van de Pas

Rileys qualifiers
  Chris Aubrey
  Curtis Bagley
  Leon Bailey
  Aaron Bateman
  Keegan Brown
  Michael Bushby
  Kirk Deruyter
  Dan Dean
  Liam Deveries
  Matthew Dicken
  Sean East
  Shaun Griffiths
  Sam Hamilton
  Curtis Hammond
  David Harnick
  Alex Harrison
  Jack Hill
  Ryan Hitchens
  Kevin Hodgin
  Ryan Hogarth
  Thomas Humphrey
  Adam Hunt
  Luke Johnson
  Scott Johnson
  Stuart Keith

  Nick Kenny
  Ash Khayat
  Jamie Landon
  Dean Lockyer
  Jack Marriner
  Ryan McCarthy
  Daniel McGivney
  Jamie McNair
  Harry Miles
  Callum Nesbit
  Graeme Orr
  Daniel Ovens
  David Pallett
  Josh Payne
  Jamie Phillips
  Dale Quince
  Liam Showell
  Damien Smith
  John Smith
  Adam Smith-Neale
  Lewis Venes
  Brandon Walsh
  David Williams
  Michael Wood
  Matthew Wright

Draw

Preliminary round

 Shaun Griffiths 4-1  Josh Payne

 Dan Dean 4-3  Jack Marriner

Last 64

References

2010 in darts
2011 in English sport
2011
2011 in darts
2012 in English sport
2012 sports events in London